Telesoft may be a reference to:

 TeleSoft, an American software products company of the 1980s and 1990s
 TeleSoft Partners, an American venture capital firm founded in the 1990s
 Telesoft Technologies, a British telephony company founded in the late 1980s
 Bharti Telesoft, an Indian telecommunications company of the 2000s that became part of Mahindra Comviva
 Gayatri Telesoft Limited, an Indian television production company for shows such as Yeh Hai Mumbai Meri Jaan
 Telesoftware, a term for "software at a distance" coined in the 1970s